Carbacanthographis brasiliensis is a species of corticolous (bark-dwelling) lichen in the family Graphidaceae. Found in São Paulo, Brazil, it was formally described as a new species in 2022 by Shirley Cunha Feuerstein and Robert Lücking. It has a whitish grey thallus without a cortex and also without a prothallus. It is similar to Carbacanthographis aptrootii, but unlike that species, it does not contain any lichen products. The specific epithet brasiliensis refers to the country from which it was first documented.

References

brasiliensis
Lichen species
Lichens described in 2022
Taxa named by Robert Lücking
Lichens of Southeast Brazil